Charles Peter "Greek" George  (December 25, 1912 in Waycross, Georgia – August 15, 1999 in Metairie, Louisiana) was a catcher in Major League Baseball. He played from 1935 to 1945. He attended college at Oglethorpe University. He was suspended for punching an umpire during a game in 1945 and never played again in the big leagues.

External links

Major League Baseball catchers
Brooklyn Dodgers players
Chicago Cubs players
Cleveland Indians players
Philadelphia Athletics players
Albany Senators players
Americus Rebels players
Birmingham Barons players
Charleston Rebels players
Chattanooga Lookouts players
Kansas City Blues (baseball) players
Milwaukee Brewers (AA) players
Minneapolis Millers (baseball) players
Nashville Vols players
Newark Bears (IL) players
Portsmouth Cubs players
Richmond Colts players
Tifton Blue Sox players
Toronto Maple Leafs (International League) players
Oglethorpe Stormy Petrels baseball players
Baseball players from Georgia (U.S. state)
People from Waycross, Georgia
1912 births
1999 deaths
New Orleans Pelicans (baseball) players
Williamsport Grays players